Kjell-Ronnie Pettersson (born 25 March 1943, in Ljungby, Sweden) is a retired Swedish ice hockey player. He spent the majority of his career with Västra Frölunda IF.

References

1943 births
Frölunda HC players
Living people
People from Ljungby Municipality
Swedish ice hockey left wingers
Sportspeople from Kronoberg County